Operation Prijedor was a German-Croatian joint counter-insurgency operation conducted around Prijedor in the Independent State of Croatia (NDH) during World War II. It targeted the Yugoslav Partisans that had isolated the garrison of Prijedor in Bosnia between late January and mid-February 1942.

Operation

The operation was led by the German 750th Infantry Regiment of the 718th Infantry Division reinforced by a number of units of the Independent State of Croatia (NDH) (including several battalions of the Croatian Home Guard). It commenced in mid-February 1942 after Operation Ozren had concluded.

The Germans advanced south from Dubica towards Prijedor, where a German garrison battalion and a number of NDH units had been isolated by Partisan attacks on the railway lines in the surrounding area. The NDH units consisted of four infantry battalions, a gendarmerie battalion and artillery support, along with 29 companies of various types. The NDH units were used to guard the roads and effect a cordon around the area of the operation. The objective of the operation was achieved, and the garrison was relieved.

References

Bibliography

See also
 Seven anti-Partisan offensives
 Resistance during World War II
 Anti-partisan operations in World War II

Prijedor
Yugoslavia in World War II
Prijedor
Prijedor
Prijedor
1942 in Bosnia and Herzegovina
Prijedor
February 1942 events